Codeine methylbromide (Eucodin) is the bromomethane (methylbromide) salt of codeine. Its possession is prohibited in many jurisdictions. It is considered a Schedule I controlled substance in the United States, with a DEA ACSCN of 9070 and nil annual aggregate manufacturing quota. as of 2014.  As it is used in a different way than basic salts of codeine like the phosphate or hydrochloride owing to its below-mentioned dual action, it is considered to be a different drug related to codeine rather than merely a salt of it in many contexts.

Also known by the genericised trade name eucodeine, and the salt name also sometimes given as methobromide, this drug was first synthesised in Austria-Hungary in 1903.  As it is a bromide in addition to a codeine salt, it has a dual mechanism of action and is indicated for pain with insomnia or nervousness and violent coughing. This codeine-based bromide also has morphine, dihydrocodeine, dihydromorphine, hydromorphone, isocodeine, hydrocodone, and other such analogues; also, there are codeine-based barbiturates and salicylates.

References

4,5-Epoxymorphinans
Opioids
Catechol ethers